Franco Martín Parodi (born 29 November 1989) is a former Argentine professional footballer who played as a striker.

Club career
In August 2009, Parodi left for Russian side Spartak Nalchik for Portuguese first division side Rio Ave F.C. His time with Rio Ave was short-lived, as 16 days after signing he left the club.

References

External links
 BDFA profile 
 Profile on the official RFPL site 

1989 births
Living people
Footballers from Buenos Aires
Argentine people of Italian descent
Argentine footballers
Association football forwards
Defensores de Belgrano footballers
Russian Premier League players
PFC Spartak Nalchik players
Primeira Liga players
Rio Ave F.C. players
S.S. Milazzo players
Defensores Unidos footballers
Argentine expatriate footballers
Expatriate footballers in Italy
Expatriate footballers in Portugal
Expatriate footballers in Russia
Argentine expatriate sportspeople in Italy
Argentine expatriate sportspeople in Portugal
Argentine expatriate sportspeople in Russia